Jean-Daniel Gerber was born in 1946. He is married to Elisabeth Gerber-Graber, with whom he has two grown children.

Career

In the late 1970s, Jean-Daniel Gerber was a Swiss delegate to the World Trade Organization (WTO).  He subsequently headed up the Developing Countries Section at Switzerland’s then Federal Office for Foreign Economic Affairs. He then moved to the Swiss Embassy in Washington as head of the Finance, Economics and Trade Division. 

In the mid-1990s, Jean-Daniel Gerber spent five years as an executive director and as dean of the World Bank Board, before being appointed director of the Federal Office for Migration at Switzerland’s Federal Department of Justice and Police in November 1997. In April 2004, he became state secretary and director of Switzerland’s State Secretariat for Economic Affairs (SECO), retiring from this post in March 2011. 

Jean-Daniel Gerber currently holds various positions: He chairs the board of SIFEM (Swiss Investment fund for Emerging Markets) and is a board member of Lonza Group AG. He is chairman of the Swiss Society for Public Good and the association “Swiss Sustainable Finance” and a member of AOAF-Foundation. He received an honorary doctorate from the University of Berne. The maxim of Jean-Daniel Gerber is “Ut melius fiat” (turn it to the better).

External links 
 http://www.sgg-ssup.ch/
http://www.reintegrationproject.ch/de/der-verein.html
http://www.sifem.ch/
http://www.lonza.com/about-lonza/company-profile/organization/board-of-directors.aspx
https://web.archive.org/web/20150815175331/http://www.sustainablefinance.ch/

1946 births
Living people
Swiss economists
Swiss diplomats
Swiss civil servants